Alexander Burnett may refer to:

Alexander Burnett of Leys (died 1619), Laird of Crathes Castle
Alexander Burnett (figure skater) in 1961 U.S. Figure Skating Championships
Alexander Burnett (politician) (born 1973), Member of the Scottish Parliament
Alexander Burnett (musician), Australian singer, songwriter and music producer
Sir Alexander Burnett, 2nd Baronet (died 1663) of the Burnett baronets
Sir Alexander Burnett, 4th Baronet (died 1758) of the Burnett baronets
Sir Alexander Burnett, 9th Baronet (1789–1856) of the Burnett baronets
Sir Alexander Edwin Burnett, 14th Baronet (1881–1959) of the Burnett baronets

See also
Alex Burnett (born 1987), baseball pitcher